Ronny Firmansyah (born in  Pasuruan, East Java, 4 May 1981) is an Indonesian footballer who plays as a midfielder.

Honours

Club
Arema Indonesia
 Indonesia Super League: 2009–10

Persik Kediri
 Liga 3: 2018

References

External 
  Profile Ronny Firmansyah

Indonesian footballers
PSMS Medan players
1981 births
Living people
Association football midfielders
People from Pasuruan
Sportspeople from East Java